Crepidula margarita is a species of sea snail, a marine gastropod mollusc in the family Calyptraeidae, the slipper snails or slipper limpets, cup-and-saucer snails, and Chinese hat snails.

Description
The maximum recorded shell length is 18.2 mm.

Habitat
Minimum recorded depth is 0.5 m. Maximum recorded depth is 1 m.

References

External links

Calyptraeidae
Gastropods described in 2006